The athletics competition at the 1967 Pan American Games was held at Pan American Stadium in Winnipeg, Manitoba, Canada.

Medal summary

Men's events

Women's events

Medal table

Participating nations

References
GBR Athletics

1967
Athletics
Pan American Games
1967 Pan American Games